Karoli may refer to:

Places
Karoli, Rewari, village in Kosli Tehsil, Rewari District, Haryana, India
Karauli, (formerly known as Karoli) town in Karauli District, Rajasthan, India